Cydnie "Carlie" Boland is a Democratic member of the Montana Legislature.  She was appointed to replace State Senator Mary Sheehy Moe of District 12 which represents the Great Falls area in 2017, who resigned due to family obligations. She was elected to a full term in 2018. Prior to serving in the State Senate, Boland served as the Representative for House District 23. She has served in the 2009 and 2011 legislative sessions.

References

Living people
Year of birth missing (living people)
Democratic Party members of the Montana House of Representatives
Women state legislators in Montana
Politicians from Great Falls, Montana
21st-century American politicians
21st-century American women politicians